is a Japanese filmmaker.

Works

Film

TV series

References

External links
 

Japanese film directors
Japanese television directors
Living people
1974 births
People from Hokkaido
People from Asahikawa